Florindo Eleuterio Flores Hala (better known as Comrade Artemio; born 8 September 1961) is a former leader of the Peruvian Maoist group Shining Path. He was captured by a combined force of the Peruvian Army.

Biography
Flores went to high school in Camana, Camana Province, Arequipa Department. He served in the Peruvian Army in the 221 Tank Battalion in Locumba, Tacna in 1979. He ended his service in December 1980. His face appears in the August 1989 video where Comrade Gonzalo appears dancing "Zorba the Greek" with all the Shining Path high command.

Very little was known about Comrade Artemio. He has appeared on video tapes, but always wearing a ski mask, often with an extra piece of cloth sewed on to hide his eyes. Messages supposed to have been written by him make the claim that he is only the regional commander of the Shining Path for the Huallaga Valley, implying that he is not the leader of the entire movement.

On 26 September 2006, a news crew from the television show Panorama interviewed Artemio in a jungle base established by Shining Path. They also filmed about 50 Shining Path militants, all of whom were masked. Artemio demanded that the Peruvian government grant amnesty to imprisoned Shining Path members and open a peace dialogue with the remaining Shining Path members. Days after the report, the National Police raided the site where Artemio gave the interview. Some Shining Path members were arrested, but Artemio was not. In November 2007, police claimed to have killed Artemio's second-in-command, a guerrilla known as JL.

In September 2008, Artemio gave his first recorded interview since 2006. In it he stated that the Shining Path would continue to fight despite escalating military pressure.

On 7 December 2011, it was reported that 'Comrade Artemio' had admitted that the Shining Path were defeated.  He is said to have offered 'dialogue' with the government regarding disarmament.

The next day, The Guardian released an interview with "Comrade Artemio," identified as Florindo Eleuterio Flores-Hala. Flores-Hala admitted "mistakes" in continuing the Shining Path's war effort, and said he was ready to negotiate terms with the Peruvian government.

On 12 February 2012, Artemio was captured by a combined force of the Peruvian Army and the Police.  Doctors removed two bullets from his stomach.

On 7 June 2013 Artemio was sentenced to life imprisonment and ordered to pay 500 million soles in civil reparations.

References

Living people
1961 births
Peruvian communists
Peruvian revolutionaries
Peruvian criminals
Members of the Shining Path